Marzijaran (also Romanized as Marzījarān and Marzījerān; also known as Marz-e Jerān, Marzgīrān, Marzī Garān, and Marz Jerān) is a village in Amiriyeh Rural District, in the Central District of Arak County, Markazi Province, Iran. At the 2006 census, its population was 3,081, in 836 families.

References 

Populated places in Arak County